Tatyana Podmaryova (born 29 November 1958) is a Soviet diver. She competed in the women's 3 metre springboard event at the 1976 Summer Olympics.

References

1958 births
Living people
Soviet female divers
Olympic divers of the Soviet Union
Divers at the 1976 Summer Olympics
Place of birth missing (living people)